Omiodes pritchardii is a moth of the family Crambidae. It was described by Otto Herman Swezey in 1948 and is endemic to the island of Hawaii.

The wingspan is about 30 mm.

The larvae feed on Pritchardia beccariana.

External links

New Species of Hawaiian Lepidoptera

Moths described in 1948
Endemic moths of Hawaii
pritchardii